Cornelius Cooney (1934 – 25 August 2018) was an Irish hurler and coach who played as a forward for club sides Carrigaline and Fermoy, at divisional level with Carrigdhoun and at inter-county level with the Cork senior hurling team.

Playing career

Club

Cooney joined the Carrigaline club at a young age and played in all grades at juvenile and underage levels. He was just 12-years-old when he played for the Carrigaline junior hurling team in the league and made his championship debut two years later in 1948.

On 8 September 1974, Cooney was captain of the Carrigaline junior team that defeated Tracton by 3-10 to 2-06 in the South East Championship final.

After playing his last game for Carrigaline in 1977, Cooney transferred to the Fermoy club. He retired from club hurling after a 40-year career in 1986.

Inter-county

Minor and junior

Cooney first played for Cork at minor level in 1952. He was an unused substitute throughout the championship campaign which eventually ended with Cork being beaten by Tipperary in the Munster semi-final.

Cooney subsequently joined the Cork junior hurling team and made his first appearance on 15 May 1955 in a 4-10 to 6-02 Munster quarter-final defeat of Tipperary. He later won a Munster Championship medal after a 5-10 to 4-04 defeat of Clare in the final. On 1 October 1955, Cooney was at midfield when he won his first All-Ireland medal after a 6-10 to 0-02 defeat of Warwickshire in the final.

Over the following few seasons Cooney was a regular member of the Cork junior team and won a second Munster Championship medal in 1958 after a 6-09 to 3-05 defeat of Waterford in the final. On 5 October 1958, Cooney won a second All-Ireland medal following Cork's 7-1- to 4-02 defeat of Warwickshire in the final.

Senior

Cooney made his first appearance for the Cork senior hurling team on 23 November 1958 in a 4-05 to 2-03 National Hurling League defeat by Waterford. Later that season on 21 June 1959 he made his championship debut in a 4-13 to 1-03 Munster Championship semi-final defeat of Clare.

Management and coaching career

Cooney served as trainer of the Kilworth junior hurling team and the St. Catherine's intermediate hurling team.

Career statistics

Honours

Carrigaline
South East Junior A Hurling Championship (1): 1974 (c)

Cork
All-Ireland Junior Hurling Championship (2): 1955, 1958
Munster Junior Hurling Championship (2): 1955, 1958

References

1934 births
2018 deaths
Carrigaline hurlers
Carrigaline Gaelic footballers
Fermoy hurlers
Fermoy Gaelic footballers
Carrigdhoun hurlers
Carrigdhoun Gaelic footballers
Cork inter-county hurlers
Hurling managers